The Nanya River is the primary right tributary of the middle Dadu River (Dadu He) — in Sichuan Province, southern China.  The Dadu is a tributary of the upper Yangtze River (Chang Jiang).

The Nanya River borders Mianning County and Shimian County and is interrupted by the Yele Dam.

References

Rivers of Sichuan
Tributaries of the Yangtze River